, professionally using the Hiragana , is a Japanese voice actress who works for Arts Vision. She was born in Tokyo.

Notable voice roles
Masao Tachibana in Captain Tsubasa (1983)
Misae Nohara in Crayon Shin-chan (1992–present)

Unknown date
Akiko Narahashi in Crayon Shin-chan
Ma-kun in Cyborg Kuro-chan
Hanako Migiwa, Junko Takamiya, Yoshiko Uesugi in Chibi Maruko-chan
Swan White and Reiko Komori in King of Braves GaoGaiGar
Tiffany Lords in the Rival Schools series
Taro in Tenchi Muyo! OVA 2nd series
Shigeru Yamaoka in Mister Ajikko
Sailor Moon (Gigaros (R - 52), Chagāma (S - 104), Kotaro (SuperS - 154), Sonoko Ijuuin (Stars - 187))
Magical Girl Pretty Sammy (Ball Girl, Fake Sick Girl)
Bonobono (Dai Nee-chan)
Miracle Girls (Risa Sarashina)
Fushigi yuugi- Mumin
Don and Katsu in Taiko no Tatsujin (2004–present)
Kasumi's Mother, Shikao, Masae-sensei in Kasumin
Nachiko in Pugyuru
Risley Law in Fairy Tail
Inuyasha (Kanta)
Shiki (Ikumi Itō)

Dubbing

Live-action
Ed Wood, Kathy O'Hara (Patricia Arquette)

Animation
The Addams Family 2, Ophelia
Camp Lazlo, Nina
Superman: The Animated Series, Livewire

References

External links
Miki Narahashi at Arts Vision (Japanese)
Miki Narahashi at Usagi
 

1960 births
Living people
Japanese video game actresses
Japanese voice actresses
Voice actresses from Tokyo
20th-century Japanese actresses
21st-century Japanese actresses
Arts Vision voice actors